Yusuf bin Ismail bin Yusuf bin Ismail bin Muhammad Nâsir al-Dîn an-Nabhani (1849–1932) born in Ijzim in Palestine, was a Palestinian Sunni Islamic scholar, judge, prolific poet, and defender of the Ottoman Caliphate. He died in Beirut.

Biography
Many of Yusuf al-Nabahani's poems, books, and teachings have remained, but very little is printed about his personal life and activities. 

He worked and campaigned against the Wahhabi movement and the reformers in Cairo like Muhammad Abduh and al-Afghani who were changing Sunni Islam. He believed in the law, or Shariah in restricting all Sufi activity, being of the Shafi madhab or thought of Sunni Islam holding a similar stance to al-Ghazali in his later years on Sufism.

His father Ismail al-Nabhani taught him to memorise the Quran at a young age, taught him the sciences of Islamic jurisprudence and then sent him to begin study at the university of al-Azhar Cairo on 16 May 1866 at the age of 17. Yusuf graduated from Al-Azhar in October 1872 at the age of 23 with qualifications from the official cirriculem of al-Azhar and many other qualifications obtained from extra study under multiple Islamic scholars in many of the sciences of the Shariah and its preparatory disciplines.

After he graduated and returned home to Ijzim, he began to hold a number of religious courses in `Akka and his home town of Ijzim. He travelled frequently to Beirut, then Damascus where he met eminent Ulema or Islamic Scholars. Chief among them was the Chief Jurist of Damascus at the time, Mahmud Effendi Hamza with whom he studied the beginning of Sahih al-Bukhari, after which he gave Yusuf a general certificate Ijaza comprising the rest of the Hadith Collections.

Then he headed for Istanbul the capital of the Ottoman Caliphate twice and worked there for several years. He edited the periodical al-Jawâ'ib until it folded. He also proofread the Arabic books that came out of its press. He left the publishers for a new position with the Ottoman Caliphate's government as a judge or Qadi.

He left Istanbul, the first time, for Iraq, to the province of Mosul, then returned to Istanbul. He left a second time in 1300 Hijri when he was appointed Chief Justice of the al-Jaza court in Latakia on the Syro-Palestinian sea-shore. After living there for five years the Ottoman government transferred him to be the grand Mufti, or Chief Justice of al-Quds or Jerusalem. Then he moved to be Chief Justice of Beirut in 1888, although some records point to 1887.

The son of his daughter, Taqiuddin al-Nabhani, was sent by Yusuf to Yusuf's Islamic colleagues & teachers in Cairo at the Al-Azhar university. Taqiuddin later went on to establish the Islamic political group Hizb ut-Tahrir.

His teachers

Shaykh Shams al-Dîn Muhammad al-Anbabi al-Shafi the grand Professor and Imam (chief) of al-Azhar, who died in 1313 Hijra Calendar.
Shaykh `Abd al-Rah.mân al-Sharbînî al-Shafi the Imam of al-Azhar, who died in 1326 Hijra Calendar.
Shaykh Ibrâhîm al-Saqqâ al-Shafi who died in 1298 Hijra Calendar aged around ninety years.
Shaykh al-Sayyid Muh.ammad al-Damanhûrî al-Shafi
Shaykh `Abd al-Qâdir al-Râfi`î al-Hanafi al-Tarabulsî the head professor of the Damascenes' Porch (Ruwâq al-Shawâmm) in al-Azhar, who died in 1323 Hijra Calendar.
Shaykh Yûsuf al-Barqâwî al-Hanbali the head Professor of the Hanbalîs' Porch in al-Azhar Mosque
Shaykh Ibrâhîm al-Zurrû al-Khalîlî al-Shafi who died in 1287 Hijra Calendar, aged around seventy.
Shaykh Ah.mad al-Ajhûrî al-D.arîr al-Shafi who died in 1293 Hijra Calendar, aged around sixty.
Shaykh H.asan al-`Adawî al-Maliki who died in 1298 Hijra Calendar aged around eighty.
Shaykh al-Sayyid `Abd al-Hâdî Najâ al-Abyârî who died in 1305 Hijra Calendar, aged just over seventy years.

In addition he named a number of other teachers in his books "Hâdî al-Murîd" and "Jâmi` Karâmât al-Awliyâ".

Books and writings

Hadi al-Murid ila Tariq al-Asanid
Jâmi` Karamat al-Awliya
Khulasat-al-Kalam fi Tarjih Din al-Islam
Hujjat-Allahi ala al-Alamin fi Mu'jizat Sayyid al-Mursalin (salla'l-Lahu 'alayhi wa sallam)
Sa'adat al-Darayn fi al-Salat 'ala Sayyid al-Kawnayn (salla'l-Lahu 'alayhi wa sallam)
Wasa'il al-Wusul ila Shama'il al-Rasul (salla'l-Lahu 'alayhi wa sallam)
Riyadh al-Jannah fi Adhkar al-Kitab wa-al-Sunnah
Anwar al-Muhammadiyah (Mukhtasar al-Mawahib al-Ladunyah)
Fada'il al-Muhammadiyah
Afdhal Al-Salawat 'ala Sayyidi As-Saadaat (salla'l-Lahu 'alayhi wa sallam)
Muntakhab al-Sahihayn (consisting of some 3010 ahadith. He also supplemented it an edited version of it entitled Qurrat al-'Ayn 'ala Muntakhab al-Sahihayn.
Al-Fath al-Kabir fi Damm al-Ziyadah ila Jami' al-Saghir – a combination of two works: al-Jami' al-Saghir of al-Suyuti with his own supplement on it entitled: Ziyadat al-Jami' al-Saghir. In this book the author has included some 14450 ahadith.
Al-Basha'ir al-Imaniyyah fi al-Mubashshirat al-Manamiyyah
Al-Nazm al-Badi' fi Mawlid al-Shafi' (salla'l-Lahu 'alayhi wa sallam)
Al-Hamzat al-Alfiyyah (Tibat al-Gharra') fi Madh Sayyid al-Anbiya' (salla'l-Lahu 'alayhi wa sallam)
Shawahid al-Haqq fi al-Istighathah bi al-Sayyid al-Khalq (salla'l-Lahu 'alayhi wa sallam)
Al-Asalib al-Badi'ah fi Fadl al-Sahabah wa-Iqna' al-Shi'ah
Qasidat al-Sa'adat al-Ma'ad fi Mawazinat Banat al-Sa'ad
Mithal Na'lihi al-Sharif (salla'l-Lahu 'alayhi wa sallam)
Al-Sabiqat al-Jiyad fi Madh Sayyid al-'Ibad (salla'l-Lahu 'alayhi wa sallam)
Al-Fada'il al-Muhammadiyyah
Al-Wird al-Shafi
Al-Mazdujah al-Gharra' fi al-Istighathah bi-asma' Allah al-Husna
Al-Majmu'ah al-Nabhaniyyah fi al-Mada'ih al-Nabawiyyah wa-Asma' Rijaliha
Nujum al-Muhtadin fi Mu'jizatihi (salla'l-Lahu 'alayhi wa sallam)wa-al-Radd 'ala A'da'ihi Ikhwan al-Shayatin
Irshad al-Hayara fi Tahdhir al-Muslimin min Madaris al-Nasara
Jami' al-Thana' 'ala Allah
Mufarrih al-Kurub wa-Mufarrih al-Qulub
Hizb al-Istighathat bi-al-Sayyid al-Sadat (salla'l-Lahu 'alayhi wa sallam)
Ahsan al-Wasa'il fi Nazm Asma' al-Nabi al-Kamil (salla'l-Lahu 'alayhi wa sallam)
Al-Asma fi-ma li-Sayyidina Muhammadin (salla'l-Lahu 'alayhi wa sallam)min al-Asma'
Al-Burhan al-Musaddid fi Ithbat Nubuwwat Sayyidina Muhammad (salla'l-Lahu 'alayhi wa sallam)
Dalil al-Tujjar ila Akhlaq al-Akhyar
Al-Rahmat al-Muhdat fi Fadl al-Salat
Husn al-Shur'ah fi Mashru'iyyat Salat al-Zuhr Ba'd al-Jumu'ah
Risalat al-Tahdhir min Ittikhadh al-Suwar wa-al-Taswir
Tanbih al-Afkar li-Hikmati Iqbal al-Dunya 'ala al-Kuffar
Sabil al-Najat fi al-Hubb fi Allah wa-al-Bughd fi Allah
Raf' al-Ishtibah fi Istihalat al-Jihhat 'ala Allah
Sa'adat al-Anam fi Ittiba' Din al-Islam
Mukhtasar Irshad al-Hiyari
Al-Ra'iyyat al-Sughra fi Dhamm al-Bid'ah (al-Wahabiyyah) wa-Madh al-Sunnat al-Gharra'
Jawahir al-Bihar fi Fada'il al-Nabi (salla'l-Lahu 'alayhi wa sallam)
Tahdhib al-Nufus fi tartib al-Durus
Ittihaf al-Muslim bi-ma Dhakarahu Sahib al-Targhib wa-al-Tarhib min Ahadith al-Bukhari wa-Muslim
Diwan al-Mada'ih al-Musamma al-'Uqud al-Lu'lu'iyyah fi al-Mada'ih al-Nabawiyyah
Al-Arba'in Arba'in min Ahadith Sayyid al-Mursalin (salla'l-Lahu 'alayhi wa sallam)
Al-Dalalat al-Wadihat (Sharh Dala'il al-Khayrat)
Al-Mubashshirat al-Manamiyyah
Salawat al-Thana' 'ala Sayyid al-Anbiya' (salla'l-Lahu 'alayhi wa sallam)
Al-Qawl al-Haqq fi Madh Sayyid al-Khalq (salla'l-Lahu 'alayhi wa sallam)
Al-Salawat al-Alfiyyah fi al-Kamalat al-Muhammadiyyah
Al-Istighathat al-Kubra bi-Asma' Allah al-Husna
Jami' al-salawat 'ala Sayyid al-Sadat (salla'l-Lahu 'alayhi wa sallam)
Al-Sharaf al-Mu'abbad li-Al Muhammad (salla'l-Lahu 'alayhi wa sallam)
Salawat al-Akhyar 'ala al-Nabi al-Mukhtar (salla'l-Lahu 'alayhi wa sallam)
Tafsir Qurrat al-'Ayn min al-Baydawi wa-al-Jalalayn
Al-Ahadith al-Arba'in fi Ujub Ta'at Amir al-Mu'minin
Al-Ahadith al-Arba'in fi Fada'il Sayyid al-Mursalin (salla'l-Lahu 'alayhi wa sallam)
Al-Ahadith al-Arba'in fi Amthal Afsah al-'Alamin (salla'l-Lahu 'alayhi wa sallam)
Arba'un Hadithan fi fada'il Ahl al-Bayt
Arba'un Hadithan fi Fadl Arba'in Sahabiyyan
Arba'un Hadithan fi Arba'in Sighatan fi al-Salat 'ala al-Nabi (salla'l-Lahu 'alayhi wa sallam)
Arba'un Hadithan fi Fadl Abi Bakr
Arba'un Hadithan fi Fadl 'Umar
Arba'un Hadithan fi Fadl Abi Bakr wa-'Umar
Arba'un Hadithan fi Fadl 'Uthman
Arba'un Hadithan fi Fadl 'Ali
Arba'un Hadithan fi Fadl La 'ilaha illa Allah
Al-Ahadith al-Arba'in fi Fadl al-Jihad wa-al-Mujahidin
Asbab al-Ta'lif min al-'Ajiz wa-al-Da'if
Al-Qasidat al-Ra'iyyat al-Kubra
Al-Siham al-Sa'ibah li Ashab al-Da'awa al-Kadhibah
Al-Salawat al-Arba'in li Awliya' al-Arba'in
Al-Khulasat al-Wafiyyah fi Rijal al-Majmu'ah al-Nabhaniyyah
Ghazawat al-Rasul (salla'l-Lahu 'alayhi wa sallam)
Khulasat al-Bayan fi Ba'd Ma'athar Mawlana al-Sultan 'Abd al-Hamid al-Thani wa-Ajdaduhu Al-'Uthma

See also 
 List of Sufis
 List of Ash'aris and Maturidis
 List of Muslim theologians

References

External links
Books
Biography 
 
Selections from "Afdhal Al-Salawat 'ala Sayyidi As-Saadaat"

Asharis
Shafi'is
Sunni Sufis
20th-century Muslim theologians
Critics of Ibn Taymiyya
Critics of Ibn al-Qayyim
Critics of Wahhabism
Sunni imams
Sunni fiqh scholars
Sunni Muslim scholars of Islam
Palestinian Muslims
Palestinian Sunni Muslims
Palestinian Sufis
Palestinian poets
Palestinian judges
Sharia judges
19th-century Muslim theologians
20th-century writers from the Ottoman Empire
1849 births
1932 deaths
19th-century writers from the Ottoman Empire